Ideological repression in the Soviet Union targeted various worldviews and the  corresponding categories of people.

Ideological repression in arts
Until the late 1920s, various forms of artistic expression were tolerated. However, an increase in the scope of Soviet political repression, marked by the first show trial, the Shakhty Trial, brought into the focus of Bolsheviks the question whether "bourgeois intelligentsia", including workers of culture and arts, can be loyal and trustworthy. As an early step was an instruction to the Russian Association of Proletarian Writers "to scourge and chastise [literature]" in the name of the Party", i.e., effectively encouraging censorship of literature on ideological grounds. Among the first targets were Yevgeny Zamiatin and Boris Pilnyak.

Soon the concept of socialist realism was established, as the officially approved form of art, an instrument of propaganda, and the main touchstone of ideological censorship.

Repression of religion

Ideological repression in science

Certain scientific fields in the Soviet Union were suppressed after being labeled as ideologically suspect. In some cases the consequences of ideological influences were dramatic. The suppression of research began during the Stalin era and continued, in softened forms, after his regime.

See also
 Bibliography of the Russian Revolution and Civil War
 Bibliography of Stalinism and the Soviet Union
 Bibliography of the post-Stalinist Soviet Union

References

Politics of the Soviet Union